Duncan Aldred (born 1970) is the Global Vice President of Buick, GMC and GMC Hummer EV at General Motors and former Opel/Vauxhall Vice President of Sales, Marketing and Aftersales.

Duncan was born in Bolton in 1970  and was first associated with Vauxhall as an undergraduate at the Ellesmere Port plant in 1990.

With Vauxhall sponsorship he graduated from Liverpool Polytechnic (Sir John Moores University) with a BA (Hons) in Business Studies in 1992. He worked in various positions in Vauxhall Sales and Marketing before his appointment as Vauxhall Retail Sales Director in February 2004.

In July 2006 he moved to Budapest as Director, Sales, Marketing and Aftersales for GM South East Europe and in April 2009, moved to Rüsselsheim, Germany to take the role of Sales Operations Director, Opel. Duncan was appointed to the role of Managing Director, Vauxhall, in January 2010, but took up the new role as Vice President of Buick-GMC sales, based in Detroit, starting on 1 March 2014. His replacement, Tim Tozer, was announced in February 2014.

See also
 Vauxhall
 Adam Opel AG

References

External links
 Vauxhall

English businesspeople
Opel people
Living people
People in the automobile industry
1970 births